On se calme et on boit frais à Saint-Tropez ("Let's calm down and drink fresh in Saint-Tropez") (1987) is the last movie made by French film-maker Max Pécas. It is also the last one of his "Saint-Tropez" trilogy.

Cast
 Andrée Damant as Madame Bardaut

External links
IMDB page

French comedy films
1987 films
1980s French-language films
1980s French films